Visby is the largest city on the Swedish island of Gotland. 

Visby may also refer to:

Ships
 Visby-class destroyer, a Swedish World War II destroyer class
 HSwMS Visby (J11), a Swedish Navy destroyer of the class
 Visby-class corvette, a class of corvette of the Swedish Navy
 HSwMS Visby (K31), lead ship of the class, launched in 2000

Places
 Visby Airport, airport north of Visby, Gotland, Sweden
 Norra Visby, a locality situated in Gotland, Sweden

Sport teams
 Visby AIK, a Swedish football club
 IFK Visby, a Swedish football club
 Visby BBK, a Swedish women's basketball club
 FC Gute (formerly Visby IF Gute), a Swedish football club

Other uses
 Battle of Visby, fought in 1361 near the town of Visby
 Diocese of Visby, a division of the Church of Sweden